Daniel Robert "Danny" King (born 14 August 1986) is a British speedway rider.

Career
Born in Maidstone, King began his career in 2001 with Peterborough Pumas. He has raced for Ipswich Witches, Birmingham Brummies, Lakeside Hammers, and Coventry Bees in the Elite League. His brother Jason was also a speedway rider.

In 2007 he finished fifth in the British Championship and qualified as a reserve for the 2007 British Grand Prix. In September 2007, King was selected to represent Great Britain for the 2007 Under 21-World Cup Final.

King captained the Birmingham Brummies in 2011, when the club were accepted into the Elite League.

On 13 June 2016, King became British Champion for the first time in his career after winning the 2016 British Speedway Championship. During the 2016 Elite League he finished 8th in the division 1 averages riding for Coventry Bees and 2nd in the averages riding for Ipswich Witches. The following season he joined the Leicester Lions in division 1 and spent two seasons with them, while still impressing for Ipswich in division 2. In 2019, Ipswich moved up a division to the SGB Premiership 2019, which resulted in King riding for them in the top tier and joining Sheffield Tigers in division 2. 

During 2021 and 2022, King rode for the Ipswich Witches in the SGB Premiership and the Poole Pirates in the SGB Championship. His move to Poole resulted in a collection of silverware as he captained the Pirates to league and cup double during the SGB Championship 2021. The following season (with King as captain again) Poole successfully defended their League and British Division 2 KO Cup titles. In addition he won the Premiership pairs with Ipswich.

In 2023, he signed for Ipswich for the SGB Premiership 2023, it was a 7th consecutive season with the club. He also signed for Redcar Bears for the SGB Championship 2023 after being released by Poole.

Honours and international competitions 
British Under-18 Champion (2004)
British Champion (2016) – Belle Vue (13 points)

Speedway Grand Prix
1 SGP, 7 points (2016).

Others
Individual U-21 World Championship
 2005 –  Wiener Neustadt – 15th place (4 points)
 2007 –  Terenzano – 9th place (3 points)
Team U-21 World Championship:
2007 –  Abensberg – Silver medal (5 points)
Speedway World Cup
2016 - 2nd

References 

1986 births
Living people
British speedway riders
English motorcycle racers
Sportspeople from Maidstone
Ipswich Witches riders
Leicester Lions riders
Mildenhall Fen Tigers riders
Peterborough Panthers riders
Poole Pirates riders
Redcar Bears riders
Rye House Rockets riders
Sheffield Tigers riders
British Speedway Championship winners